The 1933 Irish Greyhound Derby took place during August and September with the final being held on 2 September 1933 at Shelbourne Park in Dublin.

The 1933 Irish Derby was awarded to Shelbourne Park once again by the Irish Coursing Club (ICC). The Harold's Cross Stadium management were left angered after missing out again on the event. Mr Tynan representing the track had pointed out that the previous year Paddy O’Donoghue had promised that they could hold the event in 1933. I.C.C chairman John Bruton explained that they could not cancel a ruling by the club that had already been made. Tynan stormed out of a meeting with the ICC and Harold's Cross refused to run any classic competitions or their qualifying races in 1933 and threatened to run their own Irish Championship.

The winner Monologue was owned by Luke Maher and bred by John Hughes of Carlow.

Final result 
At Shelbourne Park, 2 Sep (over 525 yards):

Distances 
¾, 1

Competition Report
In the first semi final Swift Heart defeated Lacken Warrior by 6 lengths in 30.74. The second resulted in Treasure’s Hopeful beating Right Incline by half a length in 30.63 and in the third Monologue beat Mooncoin Captain.

In the final Monologue was only in fourth place after breaking from the traps but showed enough pace to take the lead by the first bend. Right Incline finished strongly but could not catch Monologue.

See also
1933 UK & Ireland Greyhound Racing Year

References

Greyhound Derby
Irish Greyhound Derby
Irish Greyhound Derby